This is a list of women artists who were born in Croatia or whose artworks are closely associated with that country.

B
Jagoda Buić (born 1930), visual artist
Helena Bulaja (born 1971), multimedia artist, film director

D
Vera Dajht-Kralj (1928–2014), sculptor
Jelena Dorotka (1876–1965), Cubist painter

E
Marta Ehrlich (1910–1980), painter

F
Eva Fischer (1920–2015), painter, engraver
Vera Fischer (1925–2009), sculptor
Ingeborg Fülepp (born 1952), artist, educator, film editor

I
Nina Ivančić (born 1953), contemporary painter, educator
Sanja Iveković (born 1949), photographer, sculptor, installation artist

K
Mira Klobučar (1888–1956), painter
Živa Kraus (born 1945), painter
Anka Krizmanić (1896–1987), painter, printmaker
Andreja Kulunčić (born 1968), contemporary artist
Heddy Kun (born 1936), Croatian-born Israeli painter

M
Tina Morpurgo (1907–1944), painter

N
Vera Nikolić Podrinska (1886–1972), painter

R
Slava Raškaj (1877–1906), prominent watercolourist

S
Stella Skopal (1904–1992), sculptor
Ana Sladetić (born 1985), artist

T
Ivana Tomljenović-Meller (1906–1988), graphic designer

U
Marija Ujević-Galetović (born 1933), sculptor

V
Miranda Vidak (active since c.2000), Croatian-American fashion designer 
Ana Vidjen (born 1931), Croatian sculptor

-
Croatian women artists, List of
Artists
Artists